Leninsky District may refer to:
Leninsky District, Russia, name of several districts and city districts in Russia
Lenin District, Bishkek, a city district of Bishkek, Kyrgyzstan
Leninsky District, Belarus, a city district (raion) of Minsk, Belarus
Leninsky District, name of Rudaki District, Tajikistan, in 1970–2003

See also
 Lenin Raion (disambiguation)
 Leninsk (disambiguation)
 Leninsky (disambiguation)
 Oleninsky District

District name disambiguation pages
Vladimir Lenin